Ichnocarpus is a genus of plant in the family Apocynaceae first described as a genus in 1810. It is native to  China, the Indian Subcontinent, + Southeast Asia.

Species
 Ichnocarpus frutescens (L.) W.T.Aiton - Fujian, Guangdong, Guangxi, Guizhou, Hainan, Yunnan, Bangladesh, Bhutan, Cambodia, India, Indonesia, Laos, Malaysia, Myanmar, Nepal, New Guinea, Pakistan, Philippines, Sri Lanka, Thailand, Vietnam, N Australia
 Ichnocarpus fulvus Kerr - Thailand, Vietnam
 Ichnocarpus uliginosus Kerr - N Thailand

References

Apocynaceae genera
Apocyneae